Three Wishes (Chinese: 三个愿望) is a Singaporean family mystery drama produced by production company Wawa Pictures and telecast on MediaCorp Channel 8. The show aired at 9 pm on weekdays and had a repeat telecast at 8 am the following day. The drama began production in June 2014 and made its debut on 27 October that year. This serial marked the return of acclaimed veteran actress Huang Biren, who was last seen in Mars vs Venus in 2007, the fifth Wawa production featuring Thomas Ong, and Apple Hong's 2014 drama series after Joys of Life in 2012. It is also the fourth Wawa production to be aired on Channel 8 after Disclosed, and the 11th Wawa production overall.

Audience reception to the drama has been largely favourable, with the viewership breaking the 1 million mark on its debut episode, a phenomenon rarely seen in local dramas, and was the fourth series at 9 pm after Soup of Life, C.L.I.F. 3 and Blessings to break the 1 million mark.

The show topped the viewership charts of MediaCorp Channel 8 dramas for that year, with an average viewership of 1.04 million viewers each night, with the finale episode drawing more than 1.1 million viewers. It is also the most watched Channel 8-Wawa production to date.

Plot
Zhao Yaozong (Thomas Ong), is a middle-aged man who works as an assistant horse trainer. He loved horses since he was a kid and trained hard through the years to realise his dream of becoming a champion horse trainer. His mentor was retiring and he thought that his chance had finally come only to see the place snatched away by a foreign horse trainer, Enlai. Enlai became his superior and proposed many changes. Yaozong was afraid of inviting trouble and slogged his guts out but still didn't meet the expectations of his boss.

Yaozong has three children. The eldest son, Zhao Youting (Shane Pow), is working as a gym instructor after his graduation. His daughter, Zhao Xiaomin (Julie Tan), who is still schooling, dreams of becoming a singer one day. His youngest son, Zhao Chenglong (Tan Junsheng), is facing the stress of PSLE. Yaozong is being bullied at work but puts up a front in front of his family to maintain his integrity of being a father figure. Deep inside, he feels terrible but he puts on a brave smile everyday just so he doesn't lose the respect of his family.

Yaozong meets a mysterious old woman who sells tissue paper. She wants to give him 3 wishes for him to fulfil what his heart desires. He does not believe her. Nevertheless, she leaves him with 3 coins for his wishes.

Enlai wants to force Yaozong to resign. He speaks behind his back and makes things difficult for him. Yaozong does not want to lose this job and be separated from his precious horses. He thought of the old woman and the 3 wishes. Although still sceptical, he decided to make a wish.

A miracle happens. Yaozong manages to complete an almost impossible task and is praised by the horse owner. He starts to grow in confidence. Xiaomin meets with an accident while chasing her idol and is trapped in the car. Her family realises she is missing and searches for her frantically. Yaozong decides to use his second wish and they rescue Xiaomin to safety.

Yaozong thinks that life has changed for the better, until he finds out that his wife, Zeng Shanmei (Huang Biren), has contracted a terminal illness. He tells her not to worry as he will use his last wish on her. He tells her all about the 3 wishes and the mysterious old woman. To his surprise, Shanmei tells him that she had arranged all these to give him confidence. She bribed the old woman to lie to Yaozong. She knew she had this illness all along but did not want him to worry. She thought of this plan, hoping that Yaozong and the family can continue living comfortably after she passes on.

Yaozong is devastated to learn that his 3 wishes were fake. Nevertheless, he uses the third wish coin to wish that Shanmei will be cured. Miraculously, his wish came true. After Shanmei recovers, she wants him to believe that the miracles were not caused by pure luck so she arranges for him and the old woman to meet. When they eventually meet, Yaozong exclaims that the wishes were true! The old woman that Shanmei arranged to meet was not the one that Yaozong met in the park that night.

When the mysterious old woman appears in front of Yaozong again, he gets greedy and request for 3 more wishes. She tells him that the previous 3 were given without asking for anything in return. However, if he were to ask for more wishes, the next 3 wishes will be granted in exchange for something else. The greater his wish, the greater the price he will have to pay. Nonetheless, he insists on getting the 3 wishes.

What price is Yaozong's family willing to pay for the wishes? Will Yaozong's family succeed in breaking this curse or be stuck in this never-ending chain reaction of unfortunate events?

Cast

Main cast

Supporting cast

Production
It is the first Channel 8 drama to spin off a children's series as a continuation. Titled Three Little Wishes, the 13-episode drama debuted on 25 December 2016, who also stars Ivan Lo who portrayed the younger version of Zhao Yaozong.

Star Awards 2015
Three Wishes won 1 out of 5 awards in Star Awards 2015, the Top Rated Drama Series for 2014.
The Star Awards are presented by Mediacorp.

See also
List of Three Wishes episodes
List of programmes broadcast by Mediacorp Channel 8

References

Singapore Chinese dramas
2014 Singaporean television series debuts
2014 Singaporean television series endings
Channel 8 (Singapore) original programming